Susan DeFreitas is an author who was born in Hart, Michigan to an American mother and a Guyanese father. DeFreitas holds an MFA from Pacific University.

Life and career
She recounts growing up in Michigan while spending her summers in the Caribbean and South Florida. She states that her ability as a storyteller stems from her experiences traveling and was influenced by her Guyanese grandparents as well as her maternal grandmother. Her fiction writing is also influenced by the Arizona high country, where she met and travelled with a gypsy caravan of circus performers.

DeFreitas holds an MFA from Pacific University and resides in Portland, Oregon and Santa Fe, New Mexico.  Her 2016 novel Hot Season won the 2017 Gold IPPY Award for Best Fiction of the Mountain West. In addition to writing DeFreitas also works as a freelance editor and book coach. DeFreitas specializes in literary fiction, speculative fiction, poetry, and memoirs. She has been influenced by writers such as Ursula K. Le Guin, Toni Morrison, and Kelly Link.

References 

American writers
Pacific University alumni
Living people
Writers from Portland, Oregon
Year of birth missing (living people)